C. canis  may refer to:
 Carasobarbus canis, a ray-finned fish species found in Israel, Jordan and Syria
 Ctenocephalides canis, the dog flea, a flea species that dwells primarily on the blood of dogs

See also
 Canis (disambiguation)